Tahinli pide is a Turkish İçli Pide flavoured with sesame paste.

Regional Tahinli Pide Styles
Aydın tahinli pide
Bursa tahinli pide
Kadınhanı tahinli pide
Kayseri tahinli pide
Kula şekerli pide
Niğde tahinli pide
Simav tahinli pide
Tavas tahinli pide

See also
Sweet roll
Fig roll
Cinnamon roll
Pita

Footnotes
Bursa'nın meşhur tahinli pidesi nerede yenir?
Bursalıların asırlık damak tadı tahinli pide
Tahinli pide tarifi

References

Turkish desserts
Cakes
Mediterranean cuisine
Middle Eastern cuisine